Acquitted for Having Committed the Deed (Italian: Assolto per aver commesso il fatto) is a 1992 Italian comedy film directed by and starring Alberto Sordi. It also features Angela Finocchiaro and Lou Castel.

It was shot on location in Rome and Los Angeles. The film's sets were designed by the art director Marco Dentici.

Synopsis
A former official of the SIAE acquires a vast empire of broadcasting companies.

Cast
 Alberto Sordi as Emilio Garrone 
 Angela Finocchiaro as Mariuccia 
  as Enzo 
 David Byrd as Shapiro 
 Lou Castel as Hartman 
 Robert Nadder as Spielberg 
  as Max 
 Byron Chung as Kawabata 
 Paul Fujimoto as Mishima 
  as Serra 
 Gianfranco Barra
 Franco Diogene 
  as Ilaria - segretaria di Serra 
  as Bistolfi
 Will Gill Jr. as Butler 
 Claudio Bertoni as Security Guard 
  as Portiera 
 Sandra Collodel as Telecronista TV 
 Elsa De Giorgi as Contessa Nicoletta 
 Mary Dicorato as Rita 
 Tiziana Kinkela as Journalist 
  as Giornalista RAI 
 Mauro Leuce
 Rosanna Muzzi Magni as Contessa Guglielmint 
 Bruno Vetti as Direttore Hotel Bristol

References

Bibliography 
 Claudio G. Fava. Alberto Sordi. Gremese Editore, 2003.

External links 
 

1992 films
Italian comedy films
1992 comedy films
1990s Italian-language films
Films directed by Alberto Sordi
Films scored by Piero Piccioni
1990s Italian films